The following are the national records in athletics in Tuvalu maintained by its national athletics federation: Tuvalu Athletics Association.

Outdoor

Key to tables:

h = hand timing

Men

Women

†: the result is not found in the complete result list of the games.  Achieved on 4 May 2005 in Funafuti, Tuvalu, by another source.

Indoor

Men

Women

Notes

References
General
OAA: National Records Oceania 5 November 2020 updated
Specific

External links

records
Tuvalu